This list of fictional frogs and toads is subsidiary to the list of fictional animals. It is restricted solely to notable frog and toad characters from notable works of fiction. Characters that appear in multiple media will have separate listings for each separate appearance, while instances in which a character has appeared in several separate works in a single medium, only the earliest will be recorded here.

Animation

This section lists frog and toad characters from animated works including CGI, stop-motion animation, traditional animation including television shows and feature-length films.

Literature

Comics

Television

Music

Video games

Mythology

Other

References

Frogs

Fictional frogs and toads